Time Passes is the debut solo album by Kelly Keagy.

The track "Wrong Again" was written and demoed by the Gary Moon-led Night Ranger in the early 1990s.

Track listing
 "Anything Goes" – 4:19 (Jack Blades, Kelly Keagy, Tim Pierce, Jeff Watson, Aaron Zigman)
 "Acid Rain" – 4:08 (Jack Blades, Jim Peterik)
 "Time Passes" – 5:03 (Kelly Keagy)
 "Before Anybody Knows I'm Gone" – 6:05 (Jack Blades, Jim Peterik)
 "Too Much to Ask" – 4:40 (Kevin Chalfant, Kelly Keagy, Jim Peterik)
 "Bottled Up" – 4:02 (Bruce Gaitsch, Kelly Keagy)
 "Too Close to the Sun" – 4:37 (Kelly Keagy, Jim Peterik)
 "Wrong Again" – 4:50 (Brad Gillis, Kelly Keagy, Gary Moon, Todd Meagher)
 "Where There's a Woman" – 5:06 (Jim Peterik)
 "The Journey" – 4:42 (Kelly Keagy, Jim Peterik)
 "The Moon" – 3:05 (R. Barron, Kelly Keagy)
 "I'm Still Here" – 5:04 (Japanese edition [MICP-10232] bonus track)

Personnel
Kelly Keagy – [lead] vocals, drums; guitar (3, 4, 7); bass (3, 7); keyboards (3); background vocals (3, 4, 6, 8, 9, 10)
Jeff Watson – lead guitar (1)
Mike Aquino – lead guitar (2); guitar (5, 9, 10)
Jim Peterik – guitar (2); background vocals (2, 9, 10); bass (5); keyboards (5, 9, 10)
Brad Gillis – lead guitar (7, 8)
Gary Moon – [lead] vocals, background vocals, bass (8)
Bruce Gaitsch – guitar (6)
Brian Bart – guitar (1, 7, 8); lead guitar (2, 3, 4, 5, 6); keyboards (2); bass (3, 4, 6)
Christian Cullen – keyboards (7)
Jodi Tanaka – Hammond B3 organ (1)
Scott May – Hammond B3 organ (4)
Jack Blades – bass (1, 2)
Bill Syniar – bass (9, 10)
J.P. Smith – background vocals (1, 7)
Ron Platt – background vocals (2)
Joe Vana – background vocals (10)

Production
Kelly Keagy – producer, engineer, mixing
Jim Peterik – producer, mixing
Brad Gillis – producer
Brian Bart – engineer, mixing
Larry Millas – engineer

External links

Heavy Harmonies page

2001 debut albums
Kelly Keagy albums
Frontiers Records albums